Prunum albertoangelai is a species of sea snail, a marine gastropod mollusk in the family Marginellidae, the margin snails.
This species was named after the famous Italian scientific journalist Alberto Angela.

Description

Distribution
This species is distributed in the Caribbean Sea along Colombia.

References

 Cossignani T. (2005) Una nuova marginella dalla Colombia (Gastropoda: Prosobranchia, Marginellidae). Malacologia Mostra Mondiale 47: 6

Marginellidae
Gastropods described in 2005